Artem Anatolevich Sedov (born 26 March 1984) is a Russian foil fencer, who earned a bronze medal in the individual and team events of the 2009 World Championships at Antalya.

References

External links 
 
  (archive)
  (archive)

Russian male foil fencers
Living people
Sportspeople from Saint Petersburg
1984 births
21st-century Russian people